Tennessee held its elections August 3–4, 1815.

See also 
 Tennessee's 5th congressional district special election, 1814
 Tennessee's 2nd congressional district special election, 1815
 United States House of Representatives elections, 1814 and 1815
 List of United States representatives from Tennessee

1815
Tennessee
United States House of Representatives